Pentecostal Mission may refer to:

Pentecostal Mission, an American 19th century holiness denomination that merged into the Church of the Nazarene in 1915
The Pentecostal Mission, a Pentecostal denomination that originated in Sri Lanka in 1923